The South Main Street Historic District of Watkinsville, Georgia is a  historic district along S. Main St. and Harden Hill Rd.  It was listed on the National Register of Historic Places in 1979.  It included 19 contributing buildings.

It includes Greek Revival, Queen Anne, and Gothic Revival architecture.  It includes the Watkinsville Methodist Church and the Butler House and the Veale House.

References

Historic districts on the National Register of Historic Places in Georgia (U.S. state)
Greek Revival architecture in Georgia (U.S. state)
Gothic Revival architecture in Georgia (U.S. state)
Queen Anne architecture in Georgia (U.S. state)
Buildings and structures completed in 1840
Oconee County, Georgia